Jack Purvis (13 July 1937 – 21 November 1997) was a British film actor. He appeared in three of director Terry Gilliam's early fantasy films, with significant roles in Time Bandits and The Adventures of Baron Munchausen.

For twenty years until 1991, Purvis performed as part of a musical comedy double-act with Kenny Baker, billed as the "Mini-Tones". Purvis played the trumpet to Baker's mouth-organ and vibraphone.
The duo would attend auditions for Star Wars in 1976, where Baker was instantly cast as R2-D2. At that time the duo had reached the final on the talent show Opportunity Knocks, and were reluctant to put the Mini-Tones work on hold. After some negotiation, Purvis was also hired to appear in the film, and would go on to play a different alien creature in each film of the original trilogy.

In 1991, Purvis became quadriplegic after his neck was broken in a car repair accident. This and the 1990 death of David Rappaport led to Terry Gilliam's indefinitely shelving an intended sequel to Time Bandits, where both actors played the titular roles.

Purvis died in November 1997 at the age of 60.

Filmography

Film

References

External links
 
 

1937 births
1997 deaths
20th-century English male actors
Actors with dwarfism
English male film actors
Male actors from London
People with tetraplegia